Formalism may refer to:
 Form (disambiguation)
 Formal (disambiguation)
 Legal formalism, legal positivist view that the substantive justice of a law is a question for the legislature rather than the judiciary
 Formalism (linguistics)
 Scientific formalism
 Formalism (philosophy), that there is no transcendent meaning to a discipline other than the literal content created by a practitioner
 Religious formalism, an emphasis on the ritual and observance of religion, rather than its meaning.
 Formalism (philosophy of mathematics), or mathematical formalism, that statements of mathematics and logic can be thought of as statements about the consequences of certain string manipulation rules.
 Formalism (art), that a work's artistic value is entirely determined by its form
 Formalism (music)
 Formalist film theory, focused on the formal, or technical, elements of a film
 Formalism (literature)
 New Formalism, a late-20th century movement in American poetry – sometimes called simply "Formalism"
 Russian formalism, school of literary criticism in Russia from the 1910s to the 1930s
 New Formalism (architecture), a mid-20th century architectural style, sometimes abbreviated to Formalism

See also
 Formality